Salona is an unincorporated community located 5 miles south of the city of Sturgeon Bay in the town of Clay Banks, in southern Door County, Wisconsin. County Highway U connects the community to Sturgeon Bay going northbound and Algoma going southbound.

References

External links
Salona Woman's Club Notes 60th Anniversary History, Door County Advocate, Volume 105, Number 16, May 12, 1966, page 5

Unincorporated communities in Wisconsin
Unincorporated communities in Door County, Wisconsin